There are two species of lizard named Storr's monitor:

 Varanus storri
 Varanus ocreatus